Narayanganj Online Press Club  is the popular place for the all Local and National print & Online based Media journalists of Narayanganj.

History  
Narayanganj Online Press Club was established in 2017 based on this principle of Development and welfare of Journalist. 

The Club celebrated a grand opening ceremony program 2023 on the occasion of entering the sixth year. On the Occasion, the convening committee and Thirty One ordinary members were announced to run the club.

References

Extra Link
Narayanganj Press Club

See Also

Jatiya Press Club

Press clubs
Bangladeshi journalism organisations